WAQE (1090 AM) is a radio station broadcasting a sports format. The station had a classic country format until August 29, 2009, when it changed to Sports Talk 1090.  The lineup includes Dan Patrick, Jim Rome, and Fox Sports Radio.  Licensed to Rice Lake, Wisconsin, United States.  The station is owned by TKC, Inc. WAQE formerly transmitted in C-QUAM AM stereo.

History
The station was assigned call sign WAQE on October 4, 1979.  On June 1, 1986, the station changed its call sign to WMYD then back to WAQE on February 1, 1992.

References

External links

AQE
Sports radio stations in the United States
Radio stations established in 1979
1979 establishments in Wisconsin
AQE